HMS Captain was a 74-gun third-rate ship of the line of the Royal Navy, launched on 26 November 1787 at Limehouse. She served during the French revolutionary and Napoleonic Wars before being placed in harbour service in 1799. An accident caused her to burn and founder in 1813. Later that year she was raised and broken up.

French Revolutionary Wars

At the start of the French Revolutionary War, she was part of the Mediterranean fleet which occupied Toulon at the invitation of the Royalists in 1793 before being driven out by Revolutionary troops in an action where Napoleon Bonaparte made his name. During this operation Captain was deployed in the Raid on Genoa. In June 1796, Admiral Sir John Jervis transferred Captain Horatio Nelson from  into Captain. Jervis appointed Nelson commodore of a squadron that was first deployed off Livorno during Napoleon's march through northern Italy.

In September 1796, Gilbert Elliot, the British viceroy of the Anglo-Corsican Kingdom, decided that it was necessary to clear out Capraja, which belonged to the Genoese and which served as a base for privateers. On their way,  joined them. The troops landed on 18 September and the island surrendered immediately. Later that month Nelson oversaw the British withdrawal from Corsica.

In February 1797, Nelson had rejoined Jervis's fleet 25 miles west of Cape St. Vincent at the southwest tip of Portugal, just before it intercepted a Spanish fleet on 14 February. The Battle of Cape St Vincent made both Jervis's and Nelson's names. Jervis was made Earl St Vincent and Nelson was knighted for his initiative and daring.

Nelson had realised that the leading Spanish ships were escaping and wore Captain to break out of the line of battle to attack the much larger Spanish ships. Captain exchanged fire with the Spanish flagship, which mounted 136 guns on four decks. With Captain hardly manoeuvrable, Nelson ran his ship alongside San Nicolas, which he boarded. Nelson was preparing to order his men to board San Josef next when she signalled her intent to surrender. The boarding of San Nicolas, which resulted in the taking of the two larger ships was later immortalised as 'Nelson's Patent Bridge for Boarding First Rates.'

Captain was the most severely damaged of the British ships as she was in the thick of the action for longer than any other ship. She returned to service following repairs and on 6 May 1799 sailed for the Mediterranean, where she joined Captain John Markham's squadron.

After the Battle of Alexandria, the squadron under Contre-Admiral Jean-Baptiste Perrée, consisting of the 40-gun Junon, 36-gun , 32-gun , 18-gun Salamine and the brig  escaped to Genoa.

In the ensuing Action of 18 June 1799, the British captured the entire French squadron, with Captain capturing Alerte. Markham described Alerte as a brig of 14 guns and 120 men, under the command of Lieutenant Dumay.

On 23 November 1800, Captain Sir Richard Strachan in Captain chased a French convoy in to the Morbihan where it sheltered under the protection of shore batteries and the 20-gun corvette Réolaise.  was able to force the corvette onto the shore at Port Navalo, though she got off again. The hired armed cutter Suworow then towed in four boats with Lieutenant Hennah of Captain and a cutting-out party of seamen and marines. The hired armed cutters  and  towed in four more boats from Magicienne. Although the cutting-out party landed under heavy fire of grape and musketry, it was able to set the corvette on fire; shortly thereafter she blew up. Only one British seaman, a crewman from Suworow, was killed. However, Suworows sails and rigging were so badly cut up that Captain had to tow her. A French report of the action stated that Captain Duclos, seeing the approach of the British, ran Réolaise on shore and burnt her.

Napoleonic Wars
In 1807 it had been one of the escorts for the expedition leaving Falmouth that would eventually attack Buenos Aires. Turned back north once the expedition reached the Cape Verde Islands.

This money was paid in June 1829.

Captain took part in the capture of Martinique in 1809. In April 1809, a strong French squadron arrived at the Îles des Saintes, south of Guadeloupe. There they were blockaded until 14 April, when a British force under Major-General Frederick Maitland invaded and captured the islands. Captain was among the naval vessels that shared in the proceeds of the capture of the islands.

Fate
Later that year, Captain was put into harbour service. On 22 March 1813, she was accidentally burned in the Hamoaze, off Plymouth, Devon. At the time, she was undergoing conversion to a sheer hulk. When it was clear that the fire, which had begun in the forecastle, had taken hold, her securing lines were cut and she was towed a safe distance away from the other vessels so that she could burn herself out. Even so, orders were given that she be sunk. Ships' launches with carronades then commenced a one-hour bombardment. She finally foundered after having burned down to the waterline. Two men died in the accident. The wreck was raised in July and broken up at Plymouth.

Notes

Citations

References

 Anthony Preston, The World's Worst Warships. Conway Maritime Press (2002). 
 Goodwin, Peter (2002) Nelson's Ships - A History of the Vessels in which he Served, 1771-1805. Conway Maritime Press. 

 
Lavery, Brian (2003) The Ship of the Line - Volume 1: The development of the battlefleet 1650-1850. Conway Maritime Press. .

External links
 

Ships of the line of the Royal Navy
Canada-class ships of the line
Ships built in Limehouse
1787 ships
Ship fires
Maritime incidents in 1813